The Moto G is an Android smartphone developed and manufactured by Motorola Mobility, at the time a subsidiary of Google. Released on 13 November 2013, the phone was initially aimed at emerging markets, although it was also available in developed markets as a low-price option.

After six months on the market, the Moto G became Motorola's best-selling smartphone ever, and was the top selling phone in Mexico and Brazil.

The Moto G was succeeded by the second generation Moto G in September 2014.

Specifications 
The phone features a 4.5 inch LCD IPS screen and a Qualcomm Snapdragon 400 quad-core processor clocked at 1.2 GHz, paired with the Adreno 305 GPU running at 450 MHz clock speed. The original operating system was Android 4.3 "Jelly Bean", with later updates to 5.1 "Lollipop".

The phone is closely related to the Moto X that was released three months prior, although there are some key differences despite their similar appearances. The Moto G is not able to have active notifications, quick capture, and touchless control like the Moto X due to the Moto X using a special processor that would be cost-prohibitive for the Moto G. In addition, the Moto G has a removable back cover so that users can customize the phone, instead of the Moto X's sealed back that is held on with an adhesive.

The original Moto G did not support LTE, due to the standard's lack of adoption in emerging markets. On 13 May 2014, Motorola unveiled an updated variant of the phone, the Moto G LTE, which added LTE support, a gyroscope, and a MicroSD card slot. By January 2015 the Android 5.0.2 "Lollipop" OTA update started rolling out and in September 2015, version 5.1 rolled out in India. As of March 2015, Motorola has been slowly upgrading handsets. Motorola started releasing the 5.1 update for Google Play Edition on April 2, 2015. In the United Kingdom, the 5.1 update started on June 12, 2015.

Availability
The Moto G was released first in Brazil and some parts of Europe. It was released in Canada and the United States on 22 November 2013 and 2 December 2013 respectively. In India, the Moto G was released on 6 February 2014 in an exclusive deal with e-commerce company Flipkart. The Moto G Google Play edition is a global GSM model available unlocked from Google Play. In the United States, the Moto G was available for Verizon, Republic Wireless, Boost Mobile, Sprint (Sprint Prepaid), Cricket Wireless, U.S. Cellular, Straight Talk and Consumer Cellular customers.

3G variants

 Wind Mobile in Canada distribute an AWS version that appears to be using a modified XT1032 baseband.

LTE variants
All LTE variants have 8 GB storage and microSD card slot that supports cards of up to 32 GB.

Critical reception
 Digital Trends – Editor's Choice Award
 IT Pro Portal – Best Buy Award
 Trusted Reviews – Product of the Year at the 2013 TrustedReviews Awards
 Trusted Reviews – Best phone under £250 of 2013
 Expert Reviews – Best budget smartphone up to February 2014
 PC Advisor – Best budget smartphone up to May 2014

References

External links
 

Android (operating system) devices
Motorola smartphones
Mobile phones introduced in 2013
Discontinued smartphones